Kwamelasemoetoe Airstrip  is an airport serving Kwamelasemoetoe, Suriname, a Trio Indian village in the south of Suriname in the Sipaliwini District. The name of the village means bamboo sand, named after nearby Sipaliwini River banks partly overgrown with bamboo.

Kwamelasemoetoe is just east of the Tigri Area (in light grey on the map), a triangular section of land disputed with Guyana.

Charters and destinations 
Charter Airlines serving this airport are:

Accidents and incidents
 On 15 October 2009, an Antonov An-28 of Blue Wing Airlines, registered PZ-TST, departed the runway on landing and hit an obstacle. The aircraft was substantially damaged and four people were injured, one seriously.

See also

 List of airports in Suriname
 Transport in Suriname

References

External links
On downwind Rwy 10 Aerial photo
Kwamalasamutu village Aerial photo
OurAirports - Kwamalasamutu
Kwamalasoemoetoe Airport

Airports in Suriname